Once a Week is a collection of  short stories and vignettes by A. A. Milne originally published in Punch. The collection was first published on 15 October 1914.

Contents
 "The Heir"
 "Winter Sport"
 "A Baker's Dozen"
 "Getting Married"
 "Home Affairs"
 "Other People's Houses"
 "Burlesques"
 "Merely Players"
 "The Men Who Succeed"

External links
 Once a Week at Project Gutenberg
 

1914 short story collections
Short story collections by A. A. Milne
Works originally published in Punch (magazine)
Methuen Publishing books
British short story collections